Adegramotide (DSP-7888) is an experimental drug intended for treatment of glioblastoma multiforme. It is a peptide vaccine and, as of 2017, in phase II clinical trials.

References 

Experimental cancer drugs
Peptide vaccines